Acrocercops crystallopa is a moth of the family Gracillariidae, known from Karnataka, India. It was described by Edward Meyrick in 1916. The hostplants for the species include Memecylon amplexicaule and Memecylon edule.

References

crystallopa
Moths of Asia
Moths described in 1916